Wonmi-gu was a district of the city of Bucheon in Gyeonggi-do, South Korea.  The district was abolished in July 2016 as Bucheon became a unified city without any administrative districts.

Administrative divisions
Wonmi-gu was divided into the following administrative districts or "Dongs".
Sosa-dong
Chunui-dong
Dodang-dong
Yakdae-dong
Simgok 1 to 3 Dong
Wonmi 1 and 2 Dong
Yeokgok 1 and 2 Dong
Jung 1 to 4 Dong
Sang 1 to 3 Dong

See also
Bucheon
Ojeong-gu
Sosa-gu

References 

Bucheon
Districts in Gyeonggi Province
2016 disestablishments in South Korea